The Anglo-French Convention of 1889 was a diplomatic agreement signed on August 10th, 1889 between Great Britain and France that delimited the border between the Gambia Protectorate and the colony of Senegal, as well as between the Lagos Colony and Dahomey. The Senegambian border was set at ten kilometers north and south of the river as far inland as Yarbutenda (near modern-day Koina, The Gambia), with a 10km radius to mark the eastern border measured from the center of town. The British therefore controlled the river as far as it was navigable by sea-going vessels. Though widely seen as temporary at the time, this borders set in 1889 has remained unchanged ever since.

See Also
 Anglo-French Convention of 1882
 Anglo-French Convention of 1898
 Entente Cordiale

References

1880s in international relations
Senegal
The Gambia